KAAK (98.9 FM) is a radio station broadcasting a Top 40 (CHR) format. Licensed to Great Falls, Montana, United States, the station serves the Great Falls area. The station is currently owned by Townsquare Media and licensed to Townsquare License, LLC.

Ownership
In June 2006, a deal was reached for KAAK to be acquired by Cherry Creek Radio from Fisher Radio Regional Group as part of a 24 station deal with a total reported sale price of $33.3 million.

References

External links

AAK
Contemporary hit radio stations in the United States
Townsquare Media radio stations